The Yazghulom ( Yazghulom) is a river in Vanj district, western Gorno-Badakhshan, Tajikistan. It is a right tributary of the Panj (upper Oxus).

It flows in a narrow valley or gorge from northeast to southwest, between two high mountain ranges, the Vanj Range to the north and the Yazgulem Range to the south. Its headwaters are near the Fedchenko Glacier.  Settlements in the valley include Matraun, Bdyn, Anderbak and Dzhamak. The Yazgulyami inhabitants number about 4,000 (as of 1990, estimate for 1940 is about 2,000).

In 1996 during the Tajik civil war, there was some fighting in Yazghulom Gorge between Yazgulem mujahidin and Tajik troops.

References

External links
Info

Rivers of Tajikistan
Gorno-Badakhshan Autonomous Region